Agencia de Noticias Fides (ANF) is a Bolivian private news agency apostolate of the Society of Jesus headquartered in La Paz, Bolivia. Founded in 1963 by José Gramunt De Moragas, it is Bolivia's oldest news agency, distributing reports on political, economic, and social events, to a majority of the news media.

References

Footnotes

Bibliography

External links 
 Official website

1963 establishments in Bolivia
News agencies based in Bolivia
Organizations established in 1963